Vladik Dzhabarov was a Soviet cyclist from Sverdlovsk. He joined the Soviet Army to fight in the Invasion of Afghanistan for two years, where he continued to keep up a relationship with his trainer, and was introduced to war correspondent Artyom Borovik.

References

Soviet male cyclists
Year of birth missing (living people)
Living people
Sportspeople from Sverdlovsk Oblast